Dashiqiao is a county-level city in south-central Liaoning province, Northeast China.

Administrative Divisions
There are five subdistricts and 11 towns under the city's administration.

Subdistricts:
Shiqiao Subdistrict, Qinghua Subdistrict, Jinqiao Subdistrict, Gangdu Subdistrict, Nanlou Subdistrict

Towns:
Shuiyuan, Gouyan, Shifo, Gaokan, Qikou, Huzhuang, Guantun, Boluopu, Yong'an, Tangchi, Huangtuling, Zhoujia

Climate

References

External links

County-level divisions of Liaoning
Yingkou